Melittomma is a genus of beetles in the family Lymexylidae, containing the following species:

 Melittomma africanum (Thomson, 1858)
 Melittomma albitarse Blair, 1936
 Melittomma auberti Fairmaire, 1891
 Melittomma benitonum Fairmaire, 1901
 Melittomma brasiliense (Laporte, 1832)
 Melittomma brunneum Fonseca & Vieira, 2001
 Melittomma coomani Pic, 1945
 Melittomma javanicum (Chevrolat, 1829)
 Melittomma lateritium Fairmaire, 1887
 Melittomma marginellum Schenkling, 1914
 Melittomma nanum Fonseca & Vieira, 2001
 Melittomma oculare (Nakane, 1963)
 Melittomma panamense Fonseca & Vieira, 2001
 Melittomma perrieri Fairmaire, 1901
 Melittomma pervagum (Olliff, 1889)
 Melittomma pilzi Orozco & Díaz, 2018

 Melittomma pubicolle Pic, 1944
 Melittomma sericeum (Harris, 1841)
 Melittomma sicardi Pic, 1939b
 Melittomma vigilans (Lea, 1912)

References

External links

Cucujoidea genera
Lymexylidae